"Talk" is a 2016 single by French record producer DJ Snake, featuring Australian singer George Maple. It was released on 2 June 2016 as the second single from DJ Snake's debut studio album, Encore. DJ Snake had hinted at the possibility of releasing new music via Twitter a few days before the single's release. It features vocals from George Maple's song "Talk Talk" that was released in December 2014. The original George Maple track "Talk Talk" was co-written by Australian songwriter Alexander Burnett, who also receives co-writing credit on the DJ Snake released version.

The 2016 track, which infuses tropical house sounds, was released by Interscope Records and made available for purchase on iTunes on 10 June 2016.

Music video
The music video for the song was released on DJ Snake's YouTube channel on 11 July 2016, with an cameo appearance by Penélope Cruz.

The video tells the story of a depressed woman who dances at clubs alone, swings alone, and lives in the junkyard. One day, a group of people bring a blue car (a Volkswagen Golf MK1 Cabriolet) to the junkyard which the woman falls in love with. Interactive scenes include a crane lifting the car from the group and also scenes of the woman dating the car. However, things take a wrong turn when she sees another woman with the car. She beats up the woman and argues with the car until eventually pouring gasoline on it and burning it. Although it seems although it was a normal car, the video shows scenes of the woman touching the cars headlights and they lit up making it seem as the car alive.

Charts

Weekly charts

Year-end charts

Release history

References

2016 singles
2016 songs
DJ Snake songs
Songs written by DJ Snake
Songs written by Flume (musician)
Interscope Records singles
Songs written by Alexander Burnett (musician)